GHA may refer to:

Entertainment 
 Ghost Hunters Academy, an American television series

Government 
 Ghana Highways Authority
 Gibraltar Health Authority
 Wheatley Homes Glasgow (formerly "Glasgow Housing Association")

Language 
 Gha, a letter used in various Turkic languages
 Gha (Indic), a glyph in the Brahmic family of scripts
 Ghadamès language, ISO 639-3 code

Sport 
Chabab Ghazieh SC, a Lebanese association football club
Gibraltar Hockey Association
 Glasgow Hutchesons Aloysians RFC, a Scottish rugby union club
 Glenn Hoddle Academy, a British football academy

Other uses 
 Georgia Hospital Association, an American trade association
 General History of Africa, a UNESCO project
 Generalized Hebbian Algorithm
 GHA Coaches, a former British bus operator
 Global hectare, in ecology
 Global Hotel Alliance
 Good Homes Alliance, UK
 Green Hills Academy, in Kathmandu, Nepal
 Greenwich hour angle
 Noumérat – Moufdi Zakaria Airport, serving Ghardaïa, Algeria, IATA code